Samaya or Samayam is a Sanskrit term referring to the "appointed or proper time, [the] right moment for doing anything." In Indian languages, samayam, or samay in Indo-Aryan languages, is a unit of time.

Meaning

Jainism

Meaning
Samaya represents the most infinitesimal part of time that cannot be divided further. The blink of an eye, or about a quarter of a second, has innumerable samaya in it. For all practical purposes a second happens to be the finest measurement of time. Jainism, however, recognizes a very small measurement of time known as samaya, which is an infinitely small part of a second.

Measurements
The following are measures of time as adopted by Jainism:
 indivisible time = 1 samaya
 innumerable samaya = 1 
 16,777,216  = 1 
 30  = 1 day and night
 15 days and nights = 1  (fortnight)
 2  = 1 month
 12 months = 1 year
 innumerable years = 1 
 10 million million  = 1 
 10 million million  = l  or 1 
 1  +  = 1  (one time cycle)

Example
When an Arihant reaches the stage of moksha (liberation), the soul travels to the Siddhashila (highest realm in universe) in one .

Hinduism
 is the basic unit of time in Hindu mythology. It is stated to be an epithet of Shiva in the Agni Purana.

Other uses
The samayachakra is the great chariot wheel of time which turns relentlessly forward.

 is a term used in Indian classical music to loosely categorize ragas into times of day. Each raga has a specific period of the day (praharam) when it is performed.

In Gandharva-Veda the day is divided into three-hour-long intervals: 4–7a.m., 7–10a.m., etc. The time concept in Gandharva-Veda is more strictly adhered to than it would be, for example, in Carnatic music.

See also
 Hindu cosmology
 Jain cosmology
 Palya
 Hasta
 Religious cosmology

References

Units of time
Hindu cosmology
Sanskrit words and phrases